The Häfeli DH-3 was a 1910 Swiss two-seat reconnaissance aircraft, built by the aircraft department of the Federal Construction Works (Eidgenoessische Konstruktionswerkstaette, (K+W)) at Thun, Switzerland.

Development and design
Following the poor performance of the DH-2, August Häfeli designed an improved version the Häfeli DH-3. It was basically the same airframe as the DH-2, the upper wing had a cutout to give a greater field of fire for the pivoting machine gun. 
It was a two-bay aircraft of wood and fabric construction, powered by a 120 hp (89 kW) Argus As II water-cooled inline engine. Initial problems with the landing gear and the engine cooling system led to modifications. Further developments were the re-engined and improved DH-3a, and the DH-3b used for engine trials. Following successful trials with an installation of the Handley Page slats all surviving DH-3as were modified in 1932.

Operational history
On 8 January 1919 a DH-3 inaugurated the first Swiss air mail service between Zurich and Berne. A DH-3 aircraft failed a structural test in 1923 which caused the DH-3 to be withdrawn from service. The DH-3a, following modification, remained in service until 1939.

Variants
DH-3
Initial production version with Argus As II engine, 24 built.
DH-3a
Improved version with Hispano-Suiza HS-41 8Aa engines, four aircraft ordered in 1919. A second order for 30 aircraft was placed in 1919 with license-built engines, a third order for 49 aircraft being placed in 1925. Survivors were modified at Thun in 1932 with Handley Page slats and changes to allow crew to wear parachutes.
DH-3b
Three aircraft powered by the indigenous 150 hp (112 kW) LFW 0 engine developed by the Swiss Locomotive and Machine Works were built in 1918.

Operators

Swiss Air Force

Specifications (DH-3a)

References

External links

 ETH-Bibliothek Zürich, Bildarchiv. Häfeli DH-3 (M III) No 530, Argus As II engine, viewer
 ETH-Bibliothek Zürich, Bildarchiv. Häfeli DH-3 M IIIb, Argus As II engine, viewer
 ETH-Bibliothek Zürich, Bildarchiv. Häfeli DH-3 aircraft, Argus As II engine, viewer
 Konstruktion Häfeli DH-3 in Thun

1910s Swiss military reconnaissance aircraft
Biplanes
Single-engined tractor aircraft
Aircraft first flown in 1917